The Lightning Car Company is a British sports car developer, originally based in Fulham and Peterborough, the company relocated to Coventry and is focused on the development and production of high performance electric sports cars.

As of August, 2020, the company's web site has not been substantially updated since 2019.

Lightning GT
The firm's first product, the eponymous Lightning GT, was unveiled in 2008 where it won Car of The Show at the last Excel London Motor Show. It is loosely based on an extant internal-combustion vehicle from Ronart Cars. It incorporates quick-charging lithium-titanate batteries from Altairnano into a body made from Carbon Fibre.

The company was taking orders for 2012 delivery, this was later moved back to 2014, and subsequently 2017. The prototype was displayed at the Coventry Motofest, featuring a revised Magtec power train.The cars have been shown since in London at the London Motor Show in 2016,in Suffolk and in Paris in 2019 where it was demonstrated.

See also
 List of production battery electric vehicles
 List of electric cars currently available

Notes

3. Green Pioneers: Can I interest you in an electric supercar?  Sunday Times article 24 October 2010

External links

Battery electric vehicle manufacturers
Electric vehicle manufacturers of the United Kingdom
Car manufacturers of the United Kingdom
Privately held companies of the United Kingdom
Sports car manufacturers